Erling Lægreid (5 September 1939 – 25 November 2011) was a Norwegian journalist and non-fiction writer. He was born in Årdalstangen. He was assigned to the Norwegian Broadcasting Corporation from 1970. He hosted several program series, including  Flimra, Ungdommens Radioavis and Søndagsavisa. Among his books are Då Noreg gjekk av skaftet from 1993 and Nærgåande skisser from 2011.

References

1939 births
2011 deaths
People from Årdal
Norwegian journalists
NRK people
Norwegian radio journalists
Norwegian non-fiction writers